The 1868 City of London by-election was held on 21 December 1868.  The by-election was fought due to the incumbent Liberal MP, George Joachim Goschen, becoming President of the Poor Law Board.  It was retained by Goschen who was unopposed.

References

City of London by-election
City of London by-election
City of London by-election
Elections in the City of London
City of London,1868
Unopposed ministerial by-elections to the Parliament of the United Kingdom in English constituencies